Dymchurch railway station is on the Romney, Hythe and Dymchurch Railway in Kent, England. It is five miles (eight km) south of Hythe, and surrounded by flat countryside.

The station opened on 16 July 1927 as Dymchurch (Marshlands), to distinguish it from a nearby station called Burmarsh for East Dymchurch and later as Dymchurch Bay.

The station has two platforms connected by a footbridge. On the 'up' platform there is a shelter and a station master's house. On the 'down' platform is a station building incorporating a booking office and staff room, a shop selling souvenirs and refreshments, and a women's toilet. The men's toilets are in the supporting pillars of the footbridge, although only that on the 'down' platform is in use.

The station is a tourist destination, largely for the sandy beaches nearby, the holiday arcades and an amusement park. It has three staff during the summer (one only, out of season). It is a block station for train control purposes.

History 
Originally larger, the 1920s station had three platforms (two through platforms and a bay platform) with an overall roof, a signal box, a turntable, and a mainline crossover to allow shuttle trains from New Romney. These never happened, and the turntable was removed in the 1930s. A second crossover was installed before the war and shuttles worked between Dymchurch and Hythe via Burmarsh Road. The signalbox was removed in the 1960s, and the remaining four switches bolted in the normal position, primitive colour-light signals being worked by domestic light switches from the booking office for normal block operations. They were not interlocked with the points, or each other. These signals were subsequently removed.

Heritage railway stations in Kent
Transport in Folkestone and Hythe
Railway stations in Great Britain opened in 1927